The fight against the abuses committed by sects has taken an international scale since the beginning of the 1980s. In France, it is first of all associations like the ADFI who actively campaigned to denounce the existence of sects, from the 1970s, followed in 1983 by a report to the Prime Minister of deputy Alain Vivien and a first parliamentary committee in 1995, before the government officially committed in 1998 in this fight with the objective of "fighting sects" then, faced with certain criticisms, "to repress sectarian aberrations".

Certain controversial positions of these antisect associations as well as of the two successive missions of the government, the MILS (Interministerial mission of fight against sects) from 1998 to 2002 then the MIVILUDES (Interministerial mission of vigilance and fight against sectarian aberrations), starting of 2002, later sparked the creation of other associations and various initiatives whose purpose is to denounce what they deem to be the excesses of the anti-sectarian struggle in France and to defend new religious movements.

Associations to combat sects 
France has a dozen associations fighting against sects or sectarian aberrations.

UNADFI 
The Union nationale des associations de défense des familles et de l'individu is a French association, which groups and coordinates regional ADFIs (Associations for the defense of families and the individual), the first of which was created in 1974.

Recognized as a public utility since 1996, a founding member of FECRIS, long chaired by former deputy Catherine Picard, co-author of the About-Picard law, the current president is Joséphine Cesbron.

CMM 
The Centre contre les manipulations mentales (CCMM) was founded in 1981 by the writer Roger Ikor. The Roger Ikor Center has been chaired since 2011 by Annie Guibert.

Defense associations for "new religious movements" 
In response to the actions of citizens, victims and their families, several associations for the defense of these "new religious movements" were created with the aim of defending freedom of conscience and denouncing what they consider to be abuses of government policy.

CAPLC 
The Coordination des associations de particuliers pour la liberté de conscience is a French association created in August 1998, which aims to defend freedom of conscience, religion and belief. For this fact, it difusses press releases and organize demonstrations.  Since August 2016, the CAP LC has been recognized by United Nations Economic and Social Council as an NGO in special consultative status with the ONU.

Criticism 
The MIVILUDES, in its 2006 report speaks of the CAP LC and the CICNS as "groups of influences which, in the name of defending freedom of conscience or religious freedom, in fact support theses favorable or borrowed from organizations sectarian."

References

See also 
Sect
European Federation of Centres of Research and Information on Sectarianism

Anti-cult movement
Anti-cult terms and concepts